The Men's Windsor round open was one of the events held in archery at the 1960 Summer Paralympics in Rome.

There were only three competitors - representing Belgium, Great Britain and the United States. The American archer, Jack Whitman, won gold with a score of 800.

References 

M